Cien días para enamorarse ( 100 Days to Fall in Love, stylized as 100 días para enamorarse) is a 2018 Argentine telenovela produced by Underground Producciones and broadcast by Telefe from May 7 to December 12, 2018.

Plot 

Laura and Antonia, best friends since adolescence, decide to put their love bonds to the test. Despite being very close, they are very different. Laura is a successful upper class lawyer, a lover of organic food and sometimes a naive mother. Antonia is a strong working-class woman, who raised her child by herself.

Laura is married to Gastón and Antonia has a relationship with the father of her daughter, although both consider that their respective relationships have worn away with the passage of time.

Laura and Gastón decide to sign a contract to separate for a hundred days, with the aim of testing the love that once united them and, at the same time, discover other forms of love.

After Laura's decision, Antonia decides to follow the same path.

Meanwhile, Antonia's child, Juani, transitions.

Cast

Main 
 Carla Peterson as Laura Contempomi. She is a successful high class lawyer who lives in the neighborhood of Puerto Madero, Buenos Aires, along with her husband Gastón and her children Santiago and Rodrigo. Laura is an intelligent woman, protective of her family and friends and, sometimes, a slightly naive mother.
 Nancy Dupláa as Antonia Salinas. She is a strong working-class woman. She grew up in her father's car shop, developing a strong character that often makes her collide with other people. Despite being like water and oil, Antonia is Laura's inseparable best friend.
 Luciano Castro as Diego Castelnuovo. He is an old friend of the group returning from Chile after having disappeared for more than a decade. Diego is a successful and lonely gynecologist, whose life will take an unexpected turn when he learns that he has a child in common with Antonia that he does not know.
 Juan Minujín as Gastón Guevara. Laura's husband and Rodrigo and Santiago's father. Gastón carries out the Guevara-Contempomi law firm with his wife, and the constant marital fights are the cause of the separation pact that begins the plot. Gastón, a somewhat selfish man, tries to adapt to the new times by being a good father.
 Constantine Ganosis as Juan Fianci

Co-Starring 
 Pablo Rago as Jorge "Coco" Carulias. He is Antonia's husband. He is a careless man, a fan of rock, and a womanizer, but with a good heart.
 Juan Gil Navarro as Javier Fernández Prieto. Ines's husband. He is a bigamist and maintains a double life in San Antonio de Areco, a town in the province of Buenos Aires.
 Jorgelina Aruzzi as Inés Sosa. She is a lawyer at the Guevara-Contemponi law firm and Javier's wife. She is an unpredictable woman, nymphomaniac, and flirtatious. She is Julieta's mother.  
 Osvaldo Laport as Chino Salinas. Antonia's father. He is a classic and conservative man, who is deeply affected by his grandson's gender transition.
 Ludovico Di Santo as Paul Contempomi. Laura's brother. He is in love with Fidel, the literature professor at Rodrigo and Juan's school. 
 Michel Noher as Fidel Garrido. The school's Literature professor. His sexuality is questioned when he meets Paul. He is the ex-husband of Catalina Connor.
 Leticia Siciliani as Carmen. The secretary, assistant and head of Human Resources of the Guevara-Contempomi study. She studies Advocacy and is a little ignorant girl, who usually takes sides with Laura in the fights she has with Gastón. She usually calls Gastón a "pig". She discovers a passion for being a YouTuber.
 Mario Pasik as Miguel Contempomi. He is the father of Laura and Paul.
 Maite Lanata as Juana "Juani" Salinas Castelnuovo/Juan Salinas Castelnuovo. The son of Antonia and Diego. At the beginning of the series, Juani is a young woman struggling with her gender identity, who does not feel comfortable with her body and who, as the series progresses, transitions to Juan, facing all the social obstacles that being a transgender boy entails, both in his family and school environment. Juan falls in love with Emma, one of his schoolmates.
 Franco Rizzaro as Rodrigo Contempomi Guevara. The son of Laura and Gastón, older brother of Santiago, and Juan's best friend. Rodrigo is a little problematic boy and is interested in becoming a DJ.
 Macarena Paz as Catalina Connor. She is Fidel's ex-wife and an English teacher at the school.
 Marita Ballesteros as Bea Méndez de Contempomi. She is the mother of Laura and Paul.
 Jeremías Batto Colini as Santiago Contempomi Guevara. He is the second son of Laura and Gastón and Rodrigo's younger brother.

Recurring 
 Manuela Pal as Florencia Fernández Berra. She is Javier's second wife and lives in San Antonio de Areco. Nicolas' mother.
 Marina Bellati as Solange. She is Emma and Aaron's mother.
 Graciela Tenenbaum as Raquel. She is the house worker at Laura and Gastón's house.
 Lola Toledo as Azul Garrido, Fidel and Catalina's daughter.
 Fiorela Duranda as Julieta Fernández Sosa, Ines and Javier's daughter.
 Luz Palazón es Lidia Molfino, the school's principal.
 Agustina Midlin as Luli Cerberos
 Malena Narvay as Emma, Juan and Rodrigo's classmate and Juan's love interest.
 Cawi Blaksley as Amparo, Fidel's niece who transfers to the school. Rodrigo's love interest. 
 Jerónimo Bosia Giocondo as Tomás.
 Junior Pisanu as Facundo
 Facundo Calvo as Ciro
 Lucía Maciel as Norma
 Paula Cancio as Clara Garrido
 Tomás Ottaviano as Nicolás Fernández Berra
 Antonella Ferrari as Charo Solís
 Juan Guilera as Matías Murano

Special participations 
 Noelia Marzol as Vanesa Perla
 Luciano Cáceres as Nicolás Pianiza
 Moria Casán as Brígida Sandoval
 Luciana Salazar as Silvia Cafa
 Eleonora Wexler as Renata Grimaldi
 Marco Antonio Caponi as Gonzalo
 Julieta Zylberberg as Patricia
 Benjamín Vicuña as Emiliano Iturria
 Verónica Llinás as Alicia Castelnuovo
 Mex Urtizberea as Félix
 Muriel Santa Ana as Anette Guevara
 Daniel Hendler as Mariano Solís
 Violeta Urtizberea as Valeria Baños
 Sandra Mihanovich as Dr. Nancy Ventura
 Virginia da Cunha as Celeste
 Facundo Espinosa as Aníbal 
 Gustavo Conti as Hernán
 Paola Barrientos as Bettina
 Abril Sánchez as Laura Contempomi (teenager)
 Lucila Torn as Antonia Salinas (teenager)
 Joaquín Flamini as Gastón Guevara (teenager)
 Agustin Vera as Diego Castelnuovo (teenager)
 Gabriel Epstein as Paul Contempomi (teenager)
 Victorio D'Alessandro as Sandro "Machete" González
 Andrea Rincón as Deborah Costa
 Justina Bustos as Ángeles Chicco Ruiz
 Lola Morán as Soledad
 Julieta Rojo as Mora
 Gonzalo Altamirano as Aarón
 Alma Gandini as Sandra 
 Malena Villa as Sofía
 Jennifer Biancucci as Pilar
 Sebastián Wainraich as Paco
 Mauricio Lavaselli as Pancho
 Emilia Claudeville as Eugenia
  Escudero as Magdalena
 Dan Breitman as Guido
 Ivana Nadal as Malena
 Joaquin Berthold as Leonidas
 Julieta Bartolomé as Noelia
 Mauro Álvarez as Géronimo
 Eliseo Barrionuevo as Manu
 Juan Pablo Pagliere as Víctor
 Juan Sorini as Benicio
 Ezequiel Quintana as Ezequiel
 Gastón Ricaud as Dr. Martín
 Luis Jacob as Francisco
 Eugenia Aguilar as Young Bettina 
 Daniela Pantano as Úrsula
 Malena Sánchez as Marina
 Laura Cymer as Telma
 Gianfranco De grossi as “Chelo”
 Dalia Gutmann as Animadora de Chicago

Reception 
Cien días para enamorarse went on air after the release of the final chapter of El Sultán, and averaged 16.0 rating points in its first installment, with a peak of 17.1 becoming the most watched of the day, surpassing Simona in its timeslot (eltrece, 9:30 p.m.), which obtained an average of 10.2.

Awards and nominations

References

External links 
  
 

2018 Argentine television series debuts
2018 Argentine television series endings
2018 telenovelas
Argentine LGBT-related television shows
Argentine telenovelas
Comedy telenovelas
Spanish-language telenovelas
Telefe telenovelas
Transgender-related television shows
2010s LGBT-related comedy television series
2010s Argentine comedy television series
Spanish-language television shows